Kirstan Kallicharan (born 29 December 1999) is a Trinidadian cricketer. He made his List A debut for the West Indies Under-19s in the 2016–17 Regional Super50 on 25 January 2017. Prior to his List A debut, he was named in the West Indies squad for the 2016 Under-19 Cricket World Cup squads. In November 2017, he was named as the vice captain of the West Indies squad for the 2018 Under-19 Cricket World Cup.

In June 2018, he was named the Best U19 Cricketer of the Year at the annual Cricket West Indies' Awards.

References

External links
 

1999 births
Living people
West Indies under-19 cricketers
Place of birth missing (living people)